Bobby Anderson may refer to:

Bobby Anderson (footballer) (1897–1974), Scottish football full back
Bobby Anderson (baseball) (1899–1975), Negro league baseball player
Bobby Anderson (actor) (1933–2008), American child actor and television producer
Bobby Anderson (American football) (born 1947), American football halfback
Bobby Anderson, guitarist for Something Corporate

See also
Bob Anderson (disambiguation)
Robert Anderson (disambiguation)